Split is an EP by the rock bands Zeke and Peter Pan Speedrock. It was released on February 12, 2005, by Bitzcore Records.

Death Train is a Zeke cover of Antiseen's "Death Train Comin'" from the 1991 album Southern Hostility.
Wang Dang is a Zeke cover of the Ted Nugent's "Wang Dang Sweet Poontang" from the 1977 album Cat Scratch Fever.

Track listing 
"Two Lane Blacktop"
"Death Train"
"10 to the Riverside Blues"
"Wang Dang"
"Fuck All Night"
"Rid"
"Better Off Dead"
"Who Was in My Room Last Night"
"Outta Control"
"Dead End (live)"
"Twist of Fate (live)"

Tracks 1-6 were written by Zeke, tracks 7-11 by Peter Pan Speedrock. Track 8 was originally written by the Butthole Surfers.

External links 
Official Peter Pan Speedrock website
Official Zeke website
Website of Peter Pan Speedrock local rockscene

Peter Pan Speedrock albums
2005 EPs
Split EPs
Zeke (band) albums